The 1986 South Dakota gubernatorial election was held on November 4, 1986 to elect the Governor of South Dakota. Incumbent Bill Janklow was term-limited, so the field for the new governor was open. Republican nominee George S. Mickelson was elected, defeating Democratic nominee Ralph Lars Herseth.

Republican primary

Candidates
 George S. Mickelson, Speaker of the South Dakota House of Representatives
 Clint Roberts, former member of the United States House of Representatives from South Dakota's 2nd district
 Lowell Hansen, incumbent Lieutenant Governor of South Dakota
 Alice Kundert, South Dakota Secretary of State

Results

Democratic primary

Candidates
 Ralph Lars Herseth, State Representative
 Richard F. Kneip, former Governor of South Dakota
 Kenneth D. Stofferahn, South Dakota Public Utilities Commissioner

Results

General election

Results

References

Gubernatorial
1986
South Dakota
November 1986 events in the United States